Colonial Theatre or Colonial Theater may refer to:

in the United States (listed by state)

Colonial Theatre (Idaho Falls, Idaho), in Bonneville County and opened in 1919
Colonial Theater (Augusta, Maine), listed on the National Register of Historic Places (NRHP) in Kennebec County
Colonial Theatre (Hagerstown, Maryland), NRHP-listed in Washington County
Colonial Theatre (Boston), a Massachusetts theatre that opened in 1900
Colonial Theatre (Pittsfield, Massachusetts), in Berkshire County and opened in 1903
Colonial Theatre (Bethlehem, New Hampshire), in Grafton County and opened in 1915
Colonial Theatre (New York City), opened in 1905
Colonial Theater (Canton, North Carolina), NRHP-listed in Howard County
Colonial Theater (Allentown, Pennsylvania), in Lehigh County and opened in 1920
Colonial Theatre (Harrisburg, Pennsylvania), NRHP-listed in Dauphin County
Colonial Theatre (Phoenixville, Pennsylvania), in Chester County and opened in 1903
Colonial Theatre (South Hill, Virginia), NRHP-listed in Mecklenburg County

See also
Colonial Theatre Complex, NRHP-listed in Laconia, Belknap County, New Hampshire